Nathan Isaiovych Altman (Ukrainian: , transliterated: Natan Isaiovych Altman;  – December 12, 1970) was a Jewish-Ukrainian artist, Cubist painter, stage designer and book illustrator.

Early life
He was born in Vinnytsia, in the Podolia Governorate of the Russian Empire (present-day Ukraine) to a family of Jewish merchants.

Career
From 1902 to 1907, he studied painting and sculpture at the Art College in Odessa (now independent Ukraine). In 1906, he had his first exhibition in Odessa.

In 1910, he went to Paris, where he stayed for one year. He studied at the Free Russian Academy in Paris, working in the studio of Wladimir Baranoff-Rossine, and had contact with Marc Chagall, Alexander Archipenko, and David Shterenberg. In 1910, he became a member of the group Soyuz Molodyozhi (Union of Youth).

In 1912, Altman moved to Saint Petersburg. His famous Portrait of Anna Akhmatova, conceived in Cubist style, was painted in 1914. From 1915 to 1917, Nathan Altman was the teacher at Mikhail Bernstein's private art school. After 1916 he started to work as a stage designer.

In 1918, he was the member of the Board for Artistic Matters within the Department of Fine Arts of the People's Commissariat of Enlightenment together with Malevich, Baranoff-Rossine and Shevchenko. In the same year he had an exhibition with the group Jewish Society for the Furthering of the Arts in Moscow, together with Wladimir Baranoff-Rossine, El Lissitzky and the others. In this same year, he installed a temporary work of architectural sculpture in Palace Square to commemorate the 1st anniversary of the October Revolution. The canvas was subsequently cut up and used for soldiers' foot bindings.

In 1920, he became a member of the Institute for Artistic Culture (INKHUK), together with Kasimir Malevich, Vladimir Tatlin and the others. In the same year, he participated in the exhibition From Impressionism to Cubism in the Museum of Painterly Culture in Petrograd.(now Saint Petersburg). In 1921, he moved to Moscow. From 1921 to 1922 he was director of the Museum of Painterly Culture in Petrograd.

From 1920 to 1928, he worked on stage designs for the Habimah Theatre and the Jewish State Theatre in Moscow. In 1923 a volume of his Jewish graphic art, Evrejskaja grafika Natana Al'tmana: Tekst Maksa Osborna [Max Osborn], was published in Berlin.

In 1925, he participated in Exposition Internationale des Arts Decoratifs et Industriels Modernes (Art Deco) in Paris together with Aleksandra Ekster, Vadim Meller, Rudolf Frentz, Sonia Delaunay-Terk and David Shterenberg. His first solo exhibition in Leningrad was in 1926.

Altman moved to Paris in 1928. In 1936, he returned to Leningrad (now Saint Petersburg). He worked mainly for the theatre, as a book illustrator and an author of essays about art.

Death
Nathan Altman died in Leningrad aged 81. The apartment building House of Specialists at 61-1 Lesnoy Prospekt features acommemorative plaque in honour of the artist.

Works
 Lady with a Dog. Portrait of Esther Schwartzmann. 1911. Oil on canvas mounted on cardboard. 67.5 x 47.5 cm. The Russian Museum, St. Petersburg, Russia.
 Jug and Tomatoes. 1912. Oil on canvas. 69.5 x 49.5 cm. The Russian Museum, St. Petersburg, Russia.
 Portrait of Anna Akhmatova. 1914. Oil on canvas. 123.5 x 103.2 cm. The Russian Museum, St. Petersburg, Russia
 Portrait of a Young Jew (Self-Portrait). 1916. Plaster of Paris, copper, wood. The Russian Museum, St. Petersburg, Russia. (Sculpture)
 Still Life. Colored Bottles and Planes. 1918. Oil and plaster on canvas. 59.5 x 43.5 cm. The Russian Museum, St. Petersburg, Russia.
 Material Painting. Still Life with a White Jug. 1919. Oil and enamel on canvas. 84.5 x 62 cm. The Russian Museum, St. Petersburg, Russia.
 Composition with Material Objects. 1920. Oil, enamel, glue, plaster and sawdust on canvas. 83 x 65.5 (oval). The Russian Museum, St. Petersburg, Russia.
 Self-Portrait. 1926. Lead pencil on paper. 44.6 x 35.9 cm. The Tretyakov Gallery, Moscow, Russia.
 Square in a Provincial Town. 1926. Italian and lead pencil on paper. 51.2 x 36.6 cm. The Tretyakov Gallery, Moscow, Russia.
 Still Life. Mixed technique on paper. 62.5 x 47 cm. The Museum of Russian Art. Erevan, Armenia.

See also
 Fine Art of Leningrad

References

External links

Example of Nathan Altman's work
Biography
Works

1889 births
1970 deaths
Artists from Vinnytsia
People from Vinnitsky Uyezd
Ukrainian Jews
20th-century Russian painters
Russian male painters
Jewish painters
Jewish socialists
Russian avant-garde
Cubist artists
Modern painters
Members of the Leningrad Union of Artists
Russian scenic designers
Modernist theatre